Noonmark Mountain is a  mountain near St. Huberts in the High Peaks region of the Adirondacks in New York, United States.  The prominent peak provides 360-degree views, including the Great Range, the Dix Range, Giant Mountain, the Ausable River valley, and the village of Keene. When seen from the nearby hamlet of Keene Valley, where it dominates the view, the peak of Noonmark Mountain is more or less directly beneath the sun at mid-day.

There are two trails up the mountain. The Felix Adler Trail, named for Dr. Felix Adler, founder of the Ethical Culture Society and a hiker who spent summers in St. Huberts, near the start of the trail.  The Stimson Trail is named for Henry L. Stimson, who scouted the original trail, and who served as Secretary of State under Herbert Hoover and Secretary of War under Franklin D. Roosevelt.

References

External links
 Adirondacks Mountain Club - Noonmark Mountain
 Peakbagger.com - Noonmark Mountain
 Summitpost.org - Noonmark
 

Mountains of Essex County, New York
Tourist attractions in Essex County, New York
Mountains of New York (state)